Stoina is a commune in Gorj County, Oltenia, Romania. It is composed of seven villages: Ciorari, Mielușei, Păișani, Stoina, Toiaga, Ulmet and Urda de Sus.

References

Communes in Gorj County
Localities in Oltenia